The moths of Togo represent about 180 known moth species. The moths (mostly nocturnal) and butterflies (mostly diurnal) together make up the taxonomic order Lepidoptera.

This is a list of moth species which have been recorded in Togo.

Anomoeotidae
Anomoeotes tenellula Holland, 1893

Arctiidae
Afraloa bifurca (Walker, 1855)
Afrasura obliterata (Walker, 1864)
Afrowatsonius marginalis (Walker, 1855)
Agylloides asurella Strand, 1912
Alpenus maculosa (Stoll, 1781)
Amata waldowi (Grünberg, 1907)
Amerila brunnea (Hampson, 1901)
Amerila luteibarba (Hampson, 1901)
Amerila roseomarginata (Rothschild, 1910)
Amphicallia pactolicus (Butler, 1888)
Amsacta flavicostata (Gaede, 1916)
Amsacta fuscosa (Bartel, 1903)
Amsacta marginalis Walker, 1855
Argina leonina (Walker, 1865)
Asura craigii (Holland, 1893)
Balacra rubrostriata (Aurivillius, 1892)
Cragia distigmata (Hampson, 1901)
Cyana delicata (Walker, 1854)
Cyana togoana (Strand, 1912)
Eilema cuneata Strand, 1912
Eilema pulverosa Aurivillius, 1904
Nanna eningae (Plötz, 1880)
Nyctemera acraeina Druce, 1882
Nyctemera apicalis (Walker, 1854)
Nyctemera perspicua (Walker, 1854)
Nyctemera togoensis (Strand, 1909)
Nyctemera xanthura (Plötz, 1880)
Pusiola hemiphaea (Hampson, 1909)
Spilosoma karschi Bartel, 1903
Spilosoma semihyalina Bartel, 1903
Spilosoma togoensis Bartel, 1903
Teracotona rhodophaea (Walker, 1865)
Thyretes negus Oberthür, 1878
Zobida trinitas (Strand, 1912)

Cossidae
Phragmataecia pelostema (Hering, 1923)

Crambidae
Protinopalpa ferreoflava Strand, 1911

Drepanidae
Gonoreta subtilis (Bryk, 1913)
Uranometra oculata (Holland, 1893)

Geometridae
Disclisioprocta natalata (Walker, 1862)
Ereunetea minor (Holland, 1893)
Ereunetea minor (Holland, 1893)
Idaea prionodonta (Prout, 1932)
Zamarada bicuspida D. S. Fletcher, 1974
Zamarada clementi Herbulot, 1975
Zamarada corroborata Herbulot, 1954
Zamarada crystallophana Mabille, 1900
Zamarada cucharita D. S. Fletcher, 1974
Zamarada dilucida Warren, 1909
Zamarada emaciata D. S. Fletcher, 1974
Zamarada euerces Prout, 1928
Zamarada iobathra Prout, 1932
Zamarada melpomene Oberthür, 1912
Zamarada mimesis D. S. Fletcher, 1974
Zamarada nasuta Warren, 1897
Zamarada platycephala D. S. Fletcher, 1974
Zamarada polyctemon Prout, 1932

Lasiocampidae
Eucraera minor (Gaede, 1915)
Mimopacha similis Hering, 1935
Morongea mastodont Zolotuhin & Prozorov, 2010
Odontocheilopteryx maculata Aurivillius, 1905
Pachyna subfascia (Walker, 1855)
Pallastica lateritia (Hering, 1928)
Pallastica phronema (Hering, 1928)
Philotherma sordida Aurivillius, 1905
Pseudolyra lineadentata (Bethune-Baker, 1911)
Streblote misanum (Strand, 1912)

Limacodidae
Cosuma rugosa Walker, 1855
Ctenolita anacompa Karsch, 1896
Ctenolita epargyra Karsch, 1896
Delorhachis nigrivenosa Karsch, 1896
Delorhachis viridiplaga Karsch, 1896
Halseyia albovenosa (Hering, 1928)
Halseyia fimbriata (Karsch, 1896)
Halseyia separata (Karsch, 1896)
Latoia cineracea (Karsch, 1896)
Latoia nivosa (Felder, 1874)
Latoia nivosa (Felder, 1874)
Latoia phlebodes (Karsch, 1896)
Micraphe lateritia Karsch, 1896
Niphadolepis nivata Karsch, 1896
Niphadolepis soluta Karsch, 1896
Parasa ananii Karsch, 1896
Parasa euchlora Karsch, 1895
Parasa prussi Karsch, 1896
Zinara ploetzi Schaus & Clements, 1893

Lymantriidae
Aroa achrodisca Hampson, 1910
Barobata trocta Karsch, 1895
Conigephyra discolepia (Hampson, 1910)
Conigephyra sericaria (Hering, 1926)
Dasychira achatina Hering, 1926
Dasychira albosignata Holland, 1893
Dasychira bacchans (Karsch, 1898)
Dasychira castor Hering, 1926
Dasychira omissa Hering, 1926
Dasychira solida (Karsch, 1895)
Heteronygmia flavescens Holland, 1893
Lacipa quadripunctata Dewitz, 1881
Laelia curvivirgata Karsch, 1895
Laelia diascia Hampson, 1905
Laelia lignicolor Holland, 1893
Laelia xyleutis Hampson, 1905
Laelioproctis taeniosoma Hering, 1926
Leucoma parva (Plötz, 1880)
Lymantria vacillans Walker, 1855
Paqueta chloroscia (Hering, 1926)
Pseudonotodonta virescens (Möschler, 1887)
Stracena oloris (Hering, 1926)
Stracena promelaena (Holland, 1893)
Viridichirana chlorophila (Hering, 1926)

Metarbelidae
Haberlandia togoensis Lehmann, 2011
Lebedodes bassa (Bethune-Baker, 1908)
Metarbela fumida Karsch, 1896
Metarbela micra Karsch, 1896
Metarbela onusta Karsch, 1896
Moyencharia ochreicosta (Gaede, 1929)
Salagena transversa Walker, 1865
Teragra insignifica Gaede, 1929

Noctuidae
Acontia hemiselenias (Hampson, 1918)
Acontia imitatrix Wallengren, 1856
Acontia porphyrea (Butler, 1898)
Acontia veroxanthia Hacker, Legrain & Fibiger, 2010
Aegocera obliqua Mabille, 1893
Agoma trimenii (Felder, 1874)
Anoba biangulata (Walker, 1869)
Asota speciosa (Drury, 1773)
Brevipecten confluens Hampson, 1926
Cerocala caelata Karsch, 1896
Digama aganais (Felder, 1874)
Eublemma tytrocoides Hacker & Hausmann, 2010
Feliniopsis kuehnei Hacker & Fibiger, 2007
Holoxanthina lutosa (Karsch, 1895)
Masalia flavocarnea (Hampson, 1903)
Masalia galatheae (Wallengren, 1856)
Misa cosmetica Karsch, 1898
Misa memnonia Karsch, 1895
Ozarba domina (Holland, 1894)
Phaegorista leucomelas (Herrich-Schäffer, 1855)
Phaegorista similis Walker, 1869
Thiacidas juvenis Hacker & Zilli, 2007
Thiacidas stassarti Hacker & Zilli, 2007

Nolidae
Maurilia conjuncta Gaede, 1915

Notodontidae
Afrocerura leonensis (Hampson, 1910)
Afrocerura leonensis (Hampson, 1910)
Afropydna indistincta (Gaede, 1928)
Amyops ingens Karsch, 1895
Anaphe subsordida Butler, 1893
Anaphe venata Butler, 1878
Antheua bidentata (Hampson, 1910)
Antheua bossumensis (Gaede, 1915)
Antheua gallans (Karsch, 1895)
Antheua simplex Walker, 1855
Bisolita minuta (Holland, 1893)
Bisolita strigata (Aurivillius, 1906)
Desmeocraera albicans Gaede, 1928
Desmeocraera vernalis Distant, 1897
Eujansea afra (Bethune-Baker, 1911)
Galona serena Karsch, 1895
Hampsonita esmeralda (Hampson, 1910)
Phalera atrata (Grünberg, 1907)
Rhenea mediata (Walker, 1865)
Scrancia stictica Hampson, 1910
Subscrancia nigra (Aurivillius, 1904)
Utidaviana citana (Schaus, 1893)

Psychidae
Acanthopsyche carbonarius Karsch, 1900

Pyralidae
Acracona remipedalis (Karsch, 1900)

Saturniidae
Aurivillius arata (Westwood, 1849)
Bunaeopsis hersilia (Westwood, 1849)
Bunaeopsis licharbas (Maassen & Weymer, 1885)
Imbrasia epimethea (Drury, 1772)
Lobobunaea christyi (Sharpe, 1889)
Lobobunaea phaedusa (Drury, 1782)
Micragone agathylla (Westwood, 1849)
Micragone rougeriei Bouyer, 2008
Nudaurelia alopia Westwood, 1849
Nudaurelia emini (Butler, 1888)
Pseudimbrasia deyrollei (J. Thomson, 1858)

Sesiidae
Albuna africana Le Cerf, 1917

Sphingidae
Temnora radiata (Karsch, 1892)

Thyrididae
Byblisia setipes (Plötz, 1880)
Cecidothyris orbiferalis (Gaede, 1917)
Lelymena misalis Karsch, 1900
Marmax hyparchus (Cramer, 1779)
Marmax semiaurata (Walker, 1854)
Trichobaptes auristrigata (Plötz, 1880)

Tortricidae
Thaumatotibia leucotreta (Meyrick, 1913)

Zygaenidae
Saliunca aurifrons Walker, 1864
Saliunca styx (Fabricius, 1775)
Syringura triplex (Plötz, 1880)

References

External links 

Togo
Moths
Togo
Togo
Togo